Erik Patrick Christian (born November 18, 1960) is an associate judge of the Superior Court of the District of Columbia.

Education and career 
Christian earned his Bachelor of Arts from Howard University in 1982 and his Juris Doctor from Georgetown University Law Center in 1986.

After graduating, he was a law clerk for Superior Court of the District of Columbia Judge Annice M. Wagner.

D.C. superior court 
President George W. Bush nominated Christian on April 4, 2001, to a fifteen-year term as an associate judge of the Superior Court of the District of Columbia to the seat vacated by Judge Eugene N. Hamilton. On May 22, 2001, the Senate Committee on Homeland Security and Governmental Affairs held a hearing on his nomination. On May 23, 2001, the Committee reported his nomination favorably to the senate floor. On May 24, 2001, the full Senate confirmed his nomination by voice vote. He was sworn in on July 20, 2001.

In 2016, following the recommendation of the District of Columbia Commission on Judicial Disabilities and Tenure, President Obama reappointed him for a second fifteen-year term.

References

1960 births
Living people
21st-century American judges
African-American judges
Georgetown University Law Center alumni
Howard University alumni
Judges of the Superior Court of the District of Columbia
Lawyers from Washington, D.C.
21st-century African-American people
20th-century African-American people